The uniform treehunter (Thripadectes ignobilis) is a species of bird in the family Furnariidae. It is found in Colombia and Ecuador.

Its natural habitats are subtropical or tropical moist lowland forest and subtropical or tropical moist montane forest. It is not considered a threatened species by the IUCN.

References

uniform treehunter
Birds of the Colombian Andes
Birds of the Ecuadorian Andes
uniform treehunter
uniform treehunter
uniform treehunter
Taxonomy articles created by Polbot